São José do Calçado is a municipality located in the Brazilian state of Espírito Santo. Its population was 10,546 (2020) and its area is 273 km².

External links
Official page

References

Municipalities in Espírito Santo